Larry Frank Wilson (March 24, 1938September 17, 2020) was an American professional football player who was a free safety with the St. Louis Cardinals of the National Football League (NFL). An eight-time Pro Bowl selection, he played his entire 13-year career with the Cardinals and remained on the team's payroll until 2003, long after the team moved to Arizona in 1988.

Wilson was inducted into the Pro Football Hall of Fame in 1978, his first year of eligibility, was named to the NFL 75th Anniversary All-Time Team in 1994 and was named to the NFL 100th Anniversary All-Time Team in 2019.

Early years
Born and raised in Rigby, Idaho, Wilson attended Rigby High School, where a plaque now hangs noting his accomplishments. After graduation in 1956, he played college football at the University of Utah, where he was a two-way starter at halfback and cornerback for the Utes under head coaches Jack Curtice and Ray Nagel.

NFL career

Player
Despite his skill and adaptability, Wilson's small size (he was only six feet tall) resulted in him not being selected until the 7th round of the 1960 NFL draft by the Chicago Cardinals. The draft was held in November 1959, and the franchise moved to St. Louis before the start of the 1960 season.

Shortly before Wilson's signing, defensive coordinator Chuck Drulis crafted a play that called for the free safety to take part in a blitz. The play was code-named "Wildcat", but Drulis didn't think he had anyone with the skills and athleticism to run it until Wilson's arrival. Drulis was impressed enough with Wilson that he persuaded the Cardinals to convert him to free safety. When the Cardinals first ran the safety blitz, the pressure was severe since most teams did not (and still do not) expect a defensive back to take part in a pass rush. This single play also helped to set up today's defenses where a blitz can come from anywhere. Wilson became so identified with the play that "Wildcat" became his nickname.

Wilson was named All-Pro six times in his career and represented the Cardinals on eight Pro Bowl teams. During 1966, he had at least one interception in seven consecutive games, en route to a 10-pick season that led his league. Fellow Idahoan Jerry Kramer, a guard for the Green Bay Packers and author of Instant Replay, called Wilson "the finest football player in the NFL." Kramer described Wilson's play during an October 30, 1967 game, "...he fired up their whole team ... (h)is enthusiasm was infectious." Wilson is renowned for not only playing, but intercepting a pass, with casts on both hands due to broken wrists. On the September 18, 2006 edition of SportsCenter, Mike Ditka challenged Terrell Owens' toughness by not playing for 2–4 weeks due to a broken finger. He cited Wilson's interception with casts on both hands as proof of a tougher football player. He ended his career with 52 career picks for 800 yards and five touchdowns, as well as 14 fumble recoveries for 173 yards and 2 more scores.

Wilson retired after the 1972 season. He is one of the few players to have played in the NFL for at least 10 years without having taken part in an official playoff game. The closest he came to postseason play was in 1964, when the Cardinals played in and won the Playoff Bowl, a postseason third-place game. It was one of only five winning seasons the Cardinals had during his 13-year career.

Executive
Following his retirement as a player, Wilson was named secondary coach and director of scouting. He stepped down as secondary coach after the 1973 season. In 1977, he was named general manager, a post he would hold (under various titles) for the next 17 years. He also served as interim head coach in 1979 after the dismissal of Bud Wilkinson. Wilson added the title of vice president in 1988, after the team's move to Arizona. He stepped down as GM in 1993, but remained as vice president until his retirement after the 2002 season.

Honors
Wilson was inducted into the Pro Football Hall of Fame in 1978, making him one of four Hall of Famers to have never played in the postseason. In 1999, he was ranked number 43 on The Sporting News' list of the 100 Greatest Football Players, making him the highest-ranked player to have played a majority of his career with the Cardinals. The team has also retired his uniform number 8. In 2007, NFL Network ranked him ninth on its list of the "Top 10 Draft Steals" in NFL history. Wilson was named to the NFL 75th Anniversary All-Time Team in 1994 and was named to the NFL 100th Anniversary All-Time Team in 2019.

Personal life
Wilson was married to Nancy Wilson for over forty years and had two children. He died on September 17, 2020 in Scottsdale, Arizona.

References

External links
 
 

1938 births
2020 deaths
American football safeties
Arizona Cardinals executives
St. Louis Cardinals (football) coaches
St. Louis Cardinals (football) players
Utah Utes football players
National Football League general managers
Eastern Conference Pro Bowl players
National Conference Pro Bowl players
National Football League players with retired numbers
Pro Football Hall of Fame inductees
Players of American football from Idaho
People from Rigby, Idaho
St. Louis Cardinals (football) head coaches